Vítězslav Gebas (born 24 March 1984 in Hradec Králové, Czechoslovakia) is a Czech slalom canoeist who has competed since the early 2000s.

He won two medals in the C1 team event at the ICF Canoe Slalom World Championships with a silver in 2014 and a bronze in 2011. He also won one silver and two bronzes in the C1 team event at the European Championships.

Gebas finished fourth in the C1 event at the 2016 Summer Olympics in Rio de Janeiro.

World Cup individual podiums

1 Oceania Canoe Slalom Open counting for World Cup points

References

Czech male canoeists
Living people
1984 births
Sportspeople from Hradec Králové
Canoeists at the 2016 Summer Olympics
Olympic canoeists of the Czech Republic
Medalists at the ICF Canoe Slalom World Championships